I Am the Empire – Live from the 013 is a live album by the symphonic power metal band Kamelot, released on August 14, 2020 via Napalm Records. It is the third live album and second live DVD/Blu-ray from the band. The album features guest appearances by Lauren Hart, Elize Ryd, Alissa White-Gluz and Charlotte Wessels.

It is the first release to feature Alex Landenburg as the band's drummer.

Track listing

Disc one

Disc two

Personnel
Kamelot
 Tommy Karevik – vocals
 Thomas Youngblood – guitars
 Sean Tibbetts – bass
 Oliver Palotai – keyboards
 Alex Landenburg – drums, percussion

Guest musicians
 Lauren Hart (Once Human) – guest vocals ("Phantom Divine (Shadow Empire)")
 Charlotte Wessels – guest vocals ("Under Grey Skies")
 Alissa White-Gluz (Arch Enemy) – guest vocals ("March of Mephisto", "Sacrimony (Angel of Afterlife)", "Liar Liar (Wasteland Monarchy)")
 Elize Ryd (Amaranthe) – guest vocals ("March of Mephisto", "My Confession" and "Sacrimony (Angel of Afterlife)")
 Eklipse – string quartet on "My Confession"
 Scarlett – violin
 Miss E. – violin
 Viola – viola
 Helena – cello

Production
 Sascha Paeth – additional guitars ("RavenLight"), mixing, mastering
 Jens de Vos – director
 Tim Tronckoe – photography
 Gustavo Sazes – cover art, layout
 Stefan Heilemann – additional artwork
 Ashley Oomen – photography

Charts

References

Kamelot albums
2020 live albums
2020 video albums
Live video albums
Napalm Records albums